Panam Panthiyile is a 1961 Indian Tamil-language film produced by MAV Pictures. The film was directed by Krishna Rao and stars S. S. Rajendran, M. R. Radha, C. R. Vijayakumari and Rajasree. It was released on 7 November 1961. The film was remade in Malayalam as Ozhukkinethire.

Plot

Cast 
The list is adapted from Thiraikalanjiyam and from the film credits.

Male cast
S. S. Rajendran
M. R. Radha
V. K. Ramasamy
A. Karunanidhi
V. M. Ezhumalai
T. V. Sathiyamoorthi
Rathinam
V. P. S. Mani
M. A. Ganapathi
C. K. Soundararajan

Female cast
C. R. Vijayakumari
Rajasree
Pushpalatha
Gemini Chandra
Indrakala
Vasantha
S. N. Lakshmi

Production 
The film was produced by M. A. Venu under his own banner MAV Pictures and was directed by Krishna Rao. The story was written by Era. Chezhiyan and the dialogues were penned by Salem Natarajan.

Soundtrack 
The music was composed by K. V. Mahadevan and the lyrics were penned by Ka. Mu. Sheriff.

Reception 
Reviewing Panam Panthiyiley, one magazine wrote, “Radha illayel padam kuppayiley!” (without Radha, the film will be in trashcans!).

References

External links 

1960s Tamil-language films
1961 drama films
Films scored by K. V. Mahadevan
Indian drama films
Tamil films remade in other languages